is a song by Japanese singer-songwriter Rina Aiuchi. It was released on 15 January 2003 through Giza Studio, as the third single from her third studio album A.I.R.. The song reached number three in Japan and has sold over 72,908 copies nationwide, as well as being certified gold by the Recording Industry Association of Japan (RIAJ). The song served as the theme song to the Japanese animated television series, Tsuribaka Nisshi.

Track listing

Charts

Certification and sales

|-
! scope="row"| Japan (RIAJ)
| 
| 72,908
|-
|}

Release history

References

2003 singles
2003 songs
J-pop songs
Song recordings produced by Daiko Nagato
Songs written by Rina Aiuchi